is a 1958 color jidaigeki (period drama) Japanese film directed by Kunio Watanabe. With box office earnings of ¥410 million, it was the most successful film of 1958 in Japan. Furthermore, it was the second-highest-grossing film of the 1950s in Japan.

Plot  
The Loyal 47 Ronin tells the true tale of a group of samurai who became rōnin (leaderless samurai) after their daimyō (feudal lord) Asano Naganori was compelled to commit seppuku (ritual suicide) for assaulting a court official, Kira Yoshinaka, who had insulted him. After carefully planning for over a year, they execute a daring assault on their sworn enemy's estate, and exact their revenge, knowing that they themselves would be forced to share their Lord's fate to atone for their crime.

Cast 

 Kazuo Hasegawa as Ōishi Kuranosuke (Ōishi Yoshio)
 Shintaro Katsu as Genzō Akagaki
 Kōji Tsuruta as Kin'emon Okano
 Raizō Ichikawa as Takuminokami Asano
 Machiko Kyō as Orui
 Fujiko Yamamoto as Yōsen'in
 Michiyo Kogure as Ukihashi
 Chikage Awashima as Riku Ōishi
 Ayako Wakao as Osuzu
 Yatarō Kurokawa as Denpachirō Okado
 Eiji Funakoshi as Tsunanori Uesugi
 Eitaro Ozawa as Hyōbu Chisaka
 Takashi Shimura as Jūbei Ōtake
 Chieko Higashiyama as Ōishi's mother Otaka
 Tamao Nakamura as Asano's maid Midori
 Michiko Ai as Karumo
 Kazuko Wakamatsu as Osugi
 Aiko Mimasu as Toda
 Masao Shimizu as Dewanokami Yanagisawa
 Jun Tazaki as Ikkaku Shimizu
 Sonosuke Sawamura as Kazusanokami Sōda
 Yoshiro Kitahara as Jūjirō Hazama
 Kazuko Ichikawa as Chonmaru
 Gen Shimizu as Chūzaemon Yoshida
 Ichirō Amano as Mankichi
 Shinobu Araki as Yahei Horibe
 Toshio Chiba as Heihachirō Yamaoka
 Saburō Date as Jūheiji Sugino
 Keiko Fujita as Momiji
 Ryūji Fukui
 Yoichi Funaki as Yogorō Kanzaki
 Fujio Harumoto as Ukyōdayū Tamura
 Akiko Hasegawa as Okū - Ōishi's daughter
 Noriko Hodaka as Yūgiri
 Yukio Horikita as Shinpachirō Yamayoshi
 Ichirō Izawa as Isuke Maebara
 Ryōsuke Kagawa as Gengoemon Kataoka
 Hiroshi Kawaguchi as Chikara Ōishi
 Jun Negami as Sagaminokami Tsuchiya
 Nakamura Ganjirō II as Gorobei Kakimi
 Osamu Takizawa as Kōzukenosuke Kira

See also 
 Forty-seven Ronin
 The 47 Ronin (元禄忠臣蔵, Genroku Chūshingura) - 1941 film by Kenji Mizoguchi
 Daichūshingura (大忠臣蔵, Daichūshingura) - 1971 television dramatization

References

External links 
  http://www.raizofan.net/link4/movie3/chushin.htm
 http://www.raizofan.net/eng/emovie2/emovie42.htm
  http://www.jmdb.ne.jp/1958/ch001420.htm
 

1958 films
Daiei Film films
Films scored by Ichirō Saitō
Films about the Forty-seven Ronin
Films directed by Kunio Watanabe
Films produced by Masaichi Nagata
Jidaigeki films
Samurai films
1950s martial arts films
1950s Japanese films